Brendan Angelides, better known by his previous stage names Eskmo and Welder, is an American electronic music producer and composer. He has released music on the record labels Interscope, Ninja Tune, Planet Mu, and Warp Records. In a 2010 review, rock music critic Robert Christgau credited Angelides with "Just the kind of weird background music that's guaranteed to engross whenever you lend it both ears".

Career

Albums 
Angelides' self-titled album, Eskmo, was released on Ninja Tune in 2010. BBC Music said of the album "..Sufficient mind-melting invention here – prior reference points or otherwise – to render Eskmo a hotter property than that chilly moniker might immediately imply." He released the Language and "Terra" EPs on Ancestor in 2012 and 2013 respectively.

In 2015, his follow up album SOL, a concept album about the sun, was released on Apollo / R&S records. It featured the artwork of UK feather sculpture artist Kate MccGwire.

In April 2017, Interscope released the original score album written by Angelides for the Netflix series 13 Reasons Why. Alongside the score, it featured a cover song of Yazoo's "Only You" produced by Angelides for Selena Gomez. Earlier in 2017, Milan Records released the original score for the Showtime series "Billions."

Film / TV 
Angelides is the composer for all 4 seasons of Netflix's original series 13 Reasons Why and all 6 seasons of Showtime's TV series Billions. In 2020, he scored the feature film Naked Singularity and the VR experience Minimum Mass, followed by Super Pumped: The Battle For Uber (Showtime) and Echoes (Netflix) in 2022.

Social outreach 
In September 2015, Angelides announced a project entitled FeelHarmonic. Its role being: "FeelHarmonic connects creatives, from a variety of fields, to collaborate on bringing the deaf community new ways to experience sound. It is the first community-based outreach program being launched under The Echo Society umbrella."

The Echo Society 
In December 2013, Angelides helped create a Los Angeles–based collective called The Echo Society. Made up of composers, visual designers and engineers, the group has put on multiple events in various locations throughout Los Angeles featuring large orchestral ensembles mixed with electronic music. Other notable composers involved are Joseph Trapanese, Rob Simonsen, Jeremy Zuckerman, Benjamin Wynn, Nathan Johnson, and Judson Crane.

Personal life
Angelides was raised in a small town in Connecticut, which is located on the eastern seaboard of the United States.

Discography

Albums
 Machines on Task (1999, self-released)
 Illuminate (2001, self-released)
 Ascension (2003, self-released)
 Vines and Streams (2006, Cyberset) 
 Eskmo (2010, Ninja Tune)
 Florescence (2011, Ancestor) 
 SOL (2015, Apollo)
 Billions OST (2017, Milan)
 13 Reasons Why OST (2017, Interscope)
 Motions Like These (2019, Ancestor) 
 Naked Singularity (Original Motion Picture Soundtrack) (2021, Lakeshore)
 Super Pumped: The Battle For Uber (Music from the Showtime Original Series) (2022, Showtime Networks / Milan)
 Echoes (Soundtrack from the Netflix Series) (2022, Netflix Music)

EPs
 Bamboo Snow (2007) as Welder
 The Willow Grail (2008)
 Chalice Well (2008) as Welder
 Purple & Orange (The Remixes) (2008) 
 Cloudlight / Come Back (2010)
 We Got More / Moving Glowstream (2011)
 Language (2012)
 Terra (2013)

Singles
 "Cower / Lord of Life" (2002)
 "Blue Tundra / Atlantis" (2003)
 "Time to React / Basement" (2004) 
 "Cliffside / Embryonic" (2005)
 "Only a Few / Forces of Spirit" (2005)
 "No Man's Land / Waterfight" (2006) 
 "Speakers Corner" (2007) 
 "Jetski" (2007)
 "Speaking in Tongues" (2007)
 "Hypercolor" (2009)
 "Agnus Dei" (2009)
 "Let Them Sing" (2009)
 "Land and Bones" (2010)
 "Aether" (from The Echo Society: Vol. 1) (2020)
 "Assassin's Creed Mirage: Into the Light (From the Cinematic World Premiere) (2022)

Productions
 Bar 9 – "Murda Sound (Eskmo Remix)" (2008)
 Bibio – "Dwrcan (Eskmo Remix)" from The Apple and the Tooth (2009)
 Spor – "Knock You Down (Eskmo Remix)" (2010)
 Amon Tobin – "Ruthless Reprise (Eskmo Remix)" from Chaos Theory Remixed: The Soundtrack to Splinter Cell 3D (2011)
 Hundred Waters – "Boreal (Eskmo Remix)" (2013)

References

External links
 
 
 

Year of birth missing (living people)
Living people
Ninja Tune artists
Warp (record label) artists
American electronic musicians
Record producers from California
American male film score composers
American television composers
Male television composers